Veintiséis de Octubre District is one of the districts of the province Piura in Peru. On February 2, 2013 the president of Peru Ollanta Humala Tasso promulgated the law Ley 29991 of territorial demarcation and organization of the province of Piura, which in its second article created the district Veintiséis de Octubre.

References

External links
 INEI Perú

2013 establishments in Peru